The 2019 PBA All-Star Weekend was the annual all-star weekend of the Philippine Basketball Association (PBA)'s 2019 season. The events were held at the Calasiao Sports Complex in Calasiao, Pangasinan. Highlighting the weekend will be the return of the North vs. South format of the All-Star game.

Friday events

Rookies/Sophomores vs. Juniors game

Game

Obstacle Challenge

First round
The winners of each pairing in the first round advanced to the final round.

Beau Belga def. Kyle Pascual
Bryan Faundo def. June Mar Fajardo
Yousef Taha def. Nonoy Baclao
Justin Chua def. Marion Magat
Raymar Jose def. Moala Tautuaa
Russel Escoto def. Prince Caperal

Second round

Beau Belga def. Bryan Faundo
Yousef Taha def. Marion Magat
Raymar Jose def. Russel Escoto

Final round

Three-Point Contest

Gold represent current champion.

Slam Dunk Contest

Gold represent the current champion.

Sunday events

Shooting Stars
The return of the Shooting Stars had a different format. There was one PBA player, one Women's 3x3 player, one Batang PBA player and a lucky fan from Cignal TV. Team B led by Jericho Cruz of Rain or Shine Elasto Painters won the Shooting Stars.

All-Star Game

Roster

The rosters for the All-Star Game were chosen in two ways. The starters were chosen via a fan ballot (online and at the venue during PBA games). Players are assigned to represent the North or South All-Star teams based from their place of birth. Players born in Luzon are assigned to the North All-Stars team while players born in Visayas and Mindanao are assigned to represent the South All-Stars. If the player is born outside the Philippines, the player is assigned to his parents' birthplace. Two guards and three frontcourt players who received the highest vote were named the All-Star starters. The reserves are voted by the twelve PBA coaches after the results of the fan ballot are released.

Game

See also
2019 PBA season
Philippine Basketball Association
Philippine Basketball Association All-Star Weekend

References

Philippine Basketball Association All-Star Weekend
All-Star